WOGO (680 AM) is a radio station  broadcasting a Conservative Talk format. Licensed to Hallie, Wisconsin, United States, the station serves the Eau Claire area.  The station is currently owned by Stewards of Sound, Inc. WOGO was originally licensed to Cornell, Wisconsin.

References

External links

OGO
News and talk radio stations in the United States
Radio stations established in 1985
1985 establishments in Wisconsin